Young Woman with a Serpent is a c. 1885 sculpture by Auguste Rodin, realised in several media. The artist later used the figure in his 1905 Adam and Eve.

Stolen bronze cast
A 1979 bronze cast of the work was stolen from a house in Beverly Hills in 1991 and was missing for two decades until the Comité Rodin, expert of the artist recognized the work in 2010 when a consignor brought it to Christie's to be auctioned. After a four-year legal battle between the insurer and the consignor, negotiations led by the Art Recovery Group resulted in the work being returned. It was subsequently sold at auction for $137,000 on November 13, 2015.

Casts
Another cast from 1988 is exhibited in the Musée Rodin.

See also
List of sculptures by Auguste Rodin

References

External links

Sculptures by Auguste Rodin
Bronze sculptures
Sculptures of the Museo Soumaya
Snakes in art
1885 sculptures
Stolen works of art